Fratto is a surname. Notable people with the surname include:

Joseph C. Fratto Jr. (born 1949), American judge
Louis Fratto (1906-1967), American mobster
Rocky Fratto (born 1958), American boxer
Rudy Fratto (born 1943), American mobster
Tony Fratto (born 1966), American government official